The 1986 World Judo Championships were the 4th and final edition of the Women's World Judo Championships, and were held in Maastricht, Netherlands from October 24 to 26 1986. The men's competition and women's competition were merged and held in the same venue from 1987 onwards.

Medal overview

Women

Medal table

References

External links
 

 page of WC-results in the Judo Encyclopedia by T. Plavecz retrieved December 11, 2013

World Judo Championships
W
Judo competitions in the Netherlands
Judo
Judo
Judo
Judo